Caveman Hughscore is a collaborative album by British bass guitarist Hugh Hopper and American trio Caveman Shoestore, released in 1995 by Tim/Kerr. Initially a one-time collaboration, the group became a regular endeavor under the name Hughscore.

Reception

François Couture of allmusic gave a positive review, saying "The album sounds fresh and exciting, and despite a few flaws stands as one of Hopper's best collaborative records of the '90s." He concluded by calling the album "a thrilling first opus and offers a unique blend of jazz-rock, avant-prog, and American post-rock."

Track listing

Personnel
Adapted from the Caveman Hughscore liner notes.

Caveman Hughscore
 Fred Chalenor – bass guitar, electric piano and synthesizer 
 Elaine di Falco – keyboards
 Henry Franzoni – drums, voice 
 Hugh Hopper – bass guitar, arrangement

Additional musicians
 Jen Harrison – French horn 
 Michael Stirling – didgeridoo 

Production and design
 Steven Birch – design
 Nick Kellogg – recording, mixing
 Marc Trunz  – photography

Release history

References

External links 
 Caveman Hughscore at Discogs (list of releases)

1995 albums
Collaborative albums
Caveman Shoestore albums
Hugh Hopper albums
Tim/Kerr Records albums